Secretin family receptor proteins, also known as Family B or family 2 of G-protein coupled receptors are regulated by peptide hormones from the glucagon hormone family. The family is different from adhesion G protein-coupled receptors.

The secretin-receptor family of GPCRs include vasoactive intestinal peptide receptors and receptors for secretin, calcitonin and parathyroid hormone/parathyroid hormone-related peptides. These receptors activate adenylyl cyclase and the phosphatidyl-inositol-calcium pathway. The receptors in this family have 7 transmembrane helices, like rhodopsin-like GPCRs. However, there is no significant sequence identity between these two GPCR families and the secretin-receptor family has its own characteristic 7TM signature.

The secretin-receptor family GPCRs exist in many animal species. Data mining with the Pfam signature has identified members in fungi, although due to their presumed non-hormonal function they are more commonly referred to as Adhesion G protein-coupled receptors, making the Adhesion subfamily the more basal group. Three distinct sub-families (B1-B3) are recognized.

Subfamily B1 
Subfamily B1 contains classical hormone receptors, such as receptors for secretin and glucagon, that are all involved in cAMP-mediated signalling pathways.

 Pituitary adenylate cyclase-activating polypeptide type 1 receptor 
 PACAPR (ADCYAP1R1)
 Calcitonin receptor 
 CALCR
 Corticotropin-releasing hormone receptor 
 CRHR1; CRHR2
 Glucose-dependent insulinotropic polypeptide receptor/Gastric inhibitory polypeptide receptor 
 GIPR
 Glucagon receptor 
 GCGR
 Glucagon receptor-related 
 GLP1R; GLP2R;
 Growth hormone releasing hormone receptor 
 GHRHR
 Parathyroid hormone receptor 
 PTHR1; PTHR2
 Secretin receptor 
 SCTR
 Vasoactive intestinal peptide receptor 
  VIPR1; VIPR2

Subfamily B2 
Subfamily B2 contains receptors with long extracellular N-termini, such as the leukocyte cell-surface antigen CD97; calcium-independent receptors for latrotoxin and brain-specific angiogenesis inhibitor receptors amongst others. They are otherwise known as Adhesion G protein-coupled receptors.

Brain-specific angiogenesis inhibitor 
 BAI1; BAI2; BAI3
 CD97 antigen 
 CD97
EMR hormone receptor 
 CELSR1; CELSR2; CELSR3; EMR1; EMR2; EMR3; EMR4
GPR56 orphan receptor 
 GPR56; GPR64; GPR97; GPR110; GPR111; GPR112; GPR113; GPR114; GPR115; GPR123; GPR125; GPR126; GPR128; GPR133; GPR144; GPR157
Latrophilin receptor 
 ELTD1; LPHN1; LPHN2; LPHN3
Ig-hepta receptor 
 GPR116

Subfamily B3 
Subfamily B3 includes Methuselah and other Drosophila proteins. Other than the typical seven-transmembrane region, characteristic structural features include an amino-terminal extracellular domain involved in ligand binding, and an intracellular loop (IC3) required for specific G-protein coupling.

Diuretic hormone receptor

Unclassified members
HCTR-5; HCTR-6; KPG 006; KPG 008

References 

Protein domains
Protein families
G protein-coupled receptors